Przeczyce  is a village in the administrative district of Gmina Mierzęcice, within Będzin County, Silesian Voivodeship, in southern Poland.

The village has a population of 1,408.

References

Przeczyce